Rambha Rambabu is a 1990 Telugu-language fantasy comedy film, produced by G. Mattayya and M. S. R. Prasad under the Sri Lakshmi Durga Movies banner and directed by Relangi Narasimha Rao. It stars Rajendra Prasad, Chandra Mohan and Parijaata, with music composed by Madhavapedhi Suresh. The film was recorded as a Hit at the box office. The film is based on Tamil film Rambaiyin Kaadhal (1956).

Plot
Rambabu (Rajendra Prasad) a rich callow, whose life ambition is to marry apsara Rambha and the entire  village heckles at him. So, his mother Jankamma (Kakinada Shymala) decides to perform his nuptial. Besides, his crafty maternal uncle Garalakantam (Suthi Velu) ploys to knit his daughter Chittitalli (Sridevi) with him. Thereby, on the guidance of their temple priest (Sakshi Ranga Rao), Rambabu performs a huge penance when Rambha (Parijaata) appears and wedlock him with the blessing of Sage Narada (Chandra Mohan). However, Janakamma disapproves it, and intrigues with Garalakantam to separate them which fails. Meanwhile, once Rambha & Rambabu insult Narada, thus he cleverly induct them before Lord Indra who prisons Rambha Anyhow, Rambabu, retrieves her with his willpower by defeating Indra. Parallelly, Rambabu reaches hell too where he views the court held by Yama Dharma Raju (Dasari Narayana Rao) and secretly learns the sins made by human. After the return, he reveals it to the public and also preaches the remedies. Hence, the hell is locked down. Exploiting it, Narada goads Yama against Indra and the war begins. But under the wire they realize the actuality, so, Indra decides to punish Rambabu when Rambha obstructs his way. Therefore, Indra's curse converts Rambha as a statue. Here as a flabbergast, Rambabu realizes everything as a dream. Now Jankamma forcibly plans his espousal where surprisingly, the bride is the same  whom he has seen in the dream. Finally, the movie ends on a happy note with their wedding.

Cast
Rajendra Prasad as Rambabu 
Parijaata as Rambha
Chandra Mohan as Narada Maharshi
Dasari Narayana Rao as Yama Dharma Raju 
Suthi Velu as Garalakantam
Raavi Kondala Rao as Chitra Gupta
Sakshi Ranga Rao as Priest
Thyagaraju as Bhetalla
K. K. Sarma
Kaasi Viswanath
Srilakshmi as Sarva Mangalam
Kakinada Shyamala as Janakamma
Sridevi as Chittitalli

Soundtrack

Music composed by Madhavapedhi Suresh.

Other
 VCDs and DVDs on - KAD Video Company, Hyderabad

References

External links

1990s Telugu-language films
1990s fantasy comedy films
Indian fantasy comedy films
Films directed by Relangi Narasimha Rao
1990 comedy films
1990 films